Sirāj al-Dīn Mahmūd ibn Abī Bakr Urmavī (also spelled Urmawī; 1198–1283) was a Persian-speaking Iranian Shafiʽi jurist, logician and philosopher from Urmia in Azerbaijan, a region in north-western Iran. He spent most of his scholarly life in Ayyubid-ruled Cairo, and from 1257 in Seljuk-ruled Konya. The Iranian diaspora he was part of, proficient in Persian and Arabic, contributed majorly to the Islamization and Persianization of Anatolia. Most of his extant works were written in Arabic but there is also one known work in Persian. He was an acquintance of Rumi.

Career 
Urmavi went to Mosul to study religion and mental science. He became a well-known scholar, not only in religion and mental studies but also in philosophy, logic, medicine, mathematics and astronomy and received praise from his professors. He was a student of Kamal al-Din ibn Yunus and found interest in his work on Fakhr al-Din al-Razi. Urmavi later travelled to Malatya to meet Awhad al-Din Kermani and was welcomed by Kayqubad I. Afterwards, he left for Damascus and Cairo. The Ayyubid Sultan As-Salih Ayyub made Urmavi an ambassador in the 1240s. In circa 1257, Urmavi moved to Konya in the Sultanate of Rum, where he wrote many works including the most famous work of his Latā'if al-ḥikma which he handed over to Kaykaus I. The reason behind his move to Konya is uncertain, but it could have been due to the Mongol invasion. In Konya, Urmavi became a qadi (religious judge) by 1266 and issued an fatwa to defend the city when the Mongols approached the city. This was welcomed by Kaykaus I who conveyed his appreciation in a letter to Urmavi and made him an elder of Anatolia. Urmavi was praised by Ahmad Aflaki who also mentioned that he was a acquaintance of Rumi and gave an anecdote on their relationship. Urmavi was moreover present at the funeral of Rumi.

Urmavi died in 1283 in Konya. Safi al-Din al-Hindi was a student of Urmavi.

Latā'if al-ḥikma 
The work Latā'if al-ḥikma was written in Persian in 1257 and about the fundamental problems in philosophy. It was dedicated to the ruler of Konya Kayqubad I and written to complement the incomplete work al-Latâif al-ghiyâthiyya of al-Razi. The first two parts of the book were titled "Hikmet-i İlmî" and "Hikmet-i Amelî" and focused on nature, the value of knowledge, the various types of knowledge, the usud ad-din and the cosmology of Ithbât al-wâjib among many other subjects. The last part of the book titled Siyâset-i Bedenî was about morality including the subjects of virtue, habits and whether habits can change through education. It also touched the subjects of home management and country administration.

Other works 
All other extant works of Urmavi were written in Arabic and include:

 Kitāb al-Tahsīl
 Kitāb al-Lubāb
 Bayān al-Haqq 
 Kitāb Maṭāli' al-anwār
 A commentary on the Wajīz of al-Ghazali (died 1111)
 A continuation of the Nihāya fī gharīb al-hadīth of Majd al-Din ibn al-Athir (died 1210)
 A commentary on the Ishārāt of Ibn Sina (died 1037)
 Works on philology and disputation ('ilm al-jadal)

See also 
 Fakhr al-Din al-Razi
 Shihab al-Din al-Qarafi
 Al-Baydawi
 Al-Sharif al-Jurjani
 List of Ash'aris and Maturidis

References

Sources 
 
 

1198 births
1283 deaths
People from Urmia
13th-century Iranian philosophers
Iranian Arabic-language writers
Iranian jurists
Iranian logicians
13th-century Persian-language writers
Sunni Muslim scholars of Islam
Shafi'is
Asharis
13th-century Muslim theologians
People from the Sultanate of Rum
Scholars from the Ayyubid Sultanate
Qadis